The Carnic Prealps (Prealpi Carniche in Italian) or Southern Carnic Alps are a mountain range in the Southern Limestone Alps, part of the larger Carnic and Gailtal Alps group. They are located in Friuli-Venezia Giulia, in the northern part of Italy.

Geography 
According to the Alpine Club classification of the Eastern Alps, the Carnic Prealps (AVE 57b) stretch from the Piave River in the south and west up to Sappada and Forni Avoltri, forming the border with the Dolomites range. The northern border with the main chain of the Carnic Alps runs along the Degano Valley to Comeglians in the Carnia region, and further eastwards via Paluzza, Ligosullo and Paularo to the Fella Valley at Pontebba. In the east the ravine of the Tagliamento River marks the border with the Julian Alps down to the Padan Plain in the south.

Administratively the range belongs to the Italian province of Pordenone and Udine.

Notable summits

Some notable summits of the range are:

See also 
 Carnic Alps

References

Maps
 Italian official cartography (Istituto Geografico Militare - IGM); on-line version: www.pcn.minambiente.it

Southern Limestone Alps
Mountain ranges of the Alps
Mountain ranges of Italy
Landforms of Friuli-Venezia Giulia